2 is the second album by the All Girl Summer Fun Band, released on the K label in 2003.

Track listing
 "Dear Mr. and Mrs. Troublemaker"
 "Down South, 10 Hours, I-5"
 "Ticking Time Bomb"
 "Jason Lee"
 "Grizzly Bear"
 "Inarticulation"
 "Daydreaming"
 "Video Game Heart"
 "Million Things"
 "Parallel Park"
 "The Longer I Wait"
 "Samantha Secret Agent"
 "Becky"
 "Tour Heart Throb"

References

2003 albums
All Girl Summer Fun Band albums
K Records albums